The County of Waldeck (later the Principality of Waldeck and Principality of Waldeck and Pyrmont) was a state of the Holy Roman Empire and its successors from the late 12th century until 1929. In 1349 the county gained Imperial immediacy and in 1712 was raised to the rank of Principality. After the dissolution of the Holy Roman Empire in 1806 it was a constituent state of its successors: the Confederation of the Rhine, the German Confederation, the North German Confederation, the German Empire and, until 1929, the Weimar Republic. It comprised territories in present-day Hesse and Lower Saxony (Germany).

History

Waldeck was a county within the Holy Roman Empire from 1180. The ruling counts were a branch of the Counts of Schwalenberg (at Schwalenberg Castle). Waldeck Castle (Waldeck), overlooking the Eder river at Waldeck and first mentioned in 1120, was inherited by count Widekind I of Schwalenberg and his son Volkwin, from the counts of Itter and the counts of Ziegenhain, when they married wives of these families. Waldeck remained the main residence of the county until 1655.

Its counts included Adolf II of Waldeck from 1270 to 1276. In 1655, the residence was shifted from Waldeck to Arolsen. In 1625, the small county of Pyrmont became part of the county through inheritance, as it had also been ruled by a branch of the counts of Schwalenberg.

In January 1712, the count of Waldeck and Pyrmont was elevated to prince by Charles VI, Holy Roman Emperor. For a brief period, 1805 to 1812, Pyrmont was a separate principality as a result of inheritance and partition after the death of the previous prince, but the two parts were united again in 1812. The independence of the principality was confirmed in 1815 by the Congress of Vienna, and Waldeck and Pyrmont became a member of the German Confederation. From 1868 onward, the principality was administered by Prussia, but retained its legislative sovereignty. Prussian administration served to reduce administrative costs for the small state and was based on a ten-year contract that was repeatedly renewed for the duration of its existence. In 1871, the principality became a constituent state of the new German Empire. At the end of World War I, during the German Revolution that resulted in the fall of all the German monarchies, the prince was deposed and the principality became the Free State of Waldeck-Pyrmont within the Weimar Republic.

The princely house of Waldeck and Pyrmont is closely related to the royal family of the Netherlands. The last ruling prince, Frederick, was the brother of Queen Consort Emma of the Netherlands.

In 1905, Waldeck and Pyrmont had an area of 1121 km2 and a population of 59,000.

Gallery of castles

Rulers of Waldeck

House of Waldeck

Partitions of Waldeck under Waldeck rule

Table of rulers

{| class="wikitable"
|- bgcolor=#cccccc
! colspan=2 | Ruler!!Born!!Reign!!Death!!Ruling part!!Consort!!Notes
|- bgcolor=#fff
| Widekind I || ||?||1107-1137||11 June 1137||County of Waldeck(at Schwalenberg until 1127)||Lutrud of Itter(d. bef. 2 March 1149)five children
|rowspan="2"| Brothers and first known ruling members of the family.
|- bgcolor=#fff
| Volkwin I || ||?||1107-1111||c. 1111||County of Waldeck(at Schwalenberg)||Unknown
|- bgcolor=#fff
| Volkwin II || ||1125||1137-1178||1178||County of Waldeck||Luitgard of Reichenbach(d. aft. 1161)1144(annulled 1161)five children|| Son of Widukind I.
|- bgcolor=#fff
| Henry I || ||c. 1170||1178-1214||11 June 1137||County of Waldeck||Heseke of Dassel(d. 25 July 1220)five children
|rowspan="3"| Sons of Volkwin II, divided the land, but was quickly reunited with Waldeck.
|- bgcolor=#fff
| Herman I || ||1163||1178-1225||1225||County of Waldeck(at Schwalenberg)||Unmarried
|- bgcolor=#dac
| Widekind II || ||1148||1178-1189||1189||County of Pyrmont||Unknownthree children
|- bgcolor=#fff
|colspan="8" align="center"|Schwalenberg annexed to Waldeck
|- bgcolor=#dac
| Gottschalk I || ||?||1189-1247||1247||County of Pyrmont||Kunigunda of Limmer(d.1239)six children||
|- bgcolor=#fff
| Adolph I || ||c. 1190||1214-1270||3 October 1270||County of Waldeck||Sophie(d.1254)two childrenEthelind of Lippe(1204-1273)14 February 1254no children
|rowspan="2"|Children of Henry I, divided the land.
|- bgcolor=#caa
| Volkwin III || ||c. 1190||1214-1255||c. 1255||County of Schwalenberg||Ermengard of Schwarzburg-Blankenburg(d.22 March 1274)14 February 1254twelve children
|- bgcolor=#fff
| Henry III || ||1225||c. 1250-1267||1267||County of Waldeck||Matilda of Cuyk-Arnsberg(1235-13 August 1298)four children|| Co-ruled with his father Adolph I, but predeceased him.
|- bgcolor=#dac
| Gottschalk II || ||?||1247-1262||1258/62||County of Pyrmont||Beatrice of Hallermund(d.1272)five children
|rowspan="2"| Children of Gottschalk I, ruled jointly.
|- bgcolor=#dac
| Herman I || ||?||1247-1265||May 1265||County of Pyrmont||Hedwig(d.20 June 1262)two children
|- bgcolor=#caa
| Widekind I || ||?||1255-1264||28 September 1264||County of Schwalenberg||Unknownc. 1246Ermengardc. 1250Unknownc. 1260two children (in total)
|rowspan="2"| Elder children of Volkwin III, divided the land. Widekind didn't have children and his part was inherited by his younger brothers, while Henry I ruled independently at Sternberg and passed it to his own descendants.
|- bgcolor=#acb
| Henry I || ||?||1255-1279||1279||County of Sternberg||? of Woldenbergtwo children
|- bgcolor=#caa
| Adolph || ||?||1264-1305||26 January 1305||County of Schwalenberg||Adelaide(d.6 July 1274)Jutta(d.1 April 1305)
|rowspan="2"| Younger children of Volkwin III, ruled jointly.
|- bgcolor=#caa
| Albert || ||c. 1190||1264-1317||After5 February 1317||County of Schwalenberg||Jutta of Rosdorf(d.aft.1 April 1305)14 February 1254twelve children
|- bgcolor=#dac
| Herman II || ||?||1265-1328||25 November 1328||County of Pyrmont||Luitgard of Waldeck- Schwalenberg(d.14 September 1317)five children
|rowspan="3"| Children of Gottschalk II and Herman I, ruled jointly. Herman III was a son of Herman I, and cousin of the other two rulers, sons of Gottschalk I.
|- bgcolor=#dac
| Gottschalk III || ||?||1265-1279||1279||County of Pyrmont||Unmarried
|- bgcolor=#dac
| Herman III || ||?||c. 1265||c. 1265||County of Pyrmont||Unmarried
|- bgcolor=#fff
| Adolph II || ||1258||1270-1276||13 December 1302||County of Waldeck||Unmarried|| Abdicated in 1276 to his brother Otto, after a dispute with him and his other brothers on who would marry Sophia of Hesse, daughter of Henry I, Landgrave of Hesse, which Otto won, resulting in Adolph's resignation. Entering in clergy, Adolph eventually became Bishop of Liège (1301-1302).
|- bgcolor=#fff
| Otto I || ||1262||1276-1305||11 November 1305||County of Waldeck||Sophia of Hesse(1264-1340)1276nine children|| Inherited the county as prize from his brothers after being chosen to marry Sophia of Hesse.
|- bgcolor=#acb
| Hoyer I || ||1252||1279-1303||1303||County of Sternberg||Agnes of Lippe(1251-aft.1307)five children|| 
|- bgcolor=#acb
| Henry II || ||?||1303-1318||8 January 1318||County of Sternberg||Jutta of Tecklenburg(d.bef. 8 January 1318)five children|| 
|- bgcolor=#fff
| Henry IV || ||1282||1305-1348||1 May 1348||County of Waldeck||Adelaide of Cleves(d.1327)1304six children|| 
|- bgcolor=#caa
| Henry II|| ||?||1317-1349||11 April 1349||County of Schwalenberg||Elisabeth of Wölpe(d. 2 February 1336)nine childrenMatilda of Rietberg(d.25 April 1400)1342/45one child|| 
|- bgcolor=#acb
| Henry III || ||?||1318-1346||1346||County of Sternberg||Hediwg of Diepholz(d.aft.1335)bef.14 September 1330four children
|rowspan="2"|Children of Hoyer II, ruled jointly. 
|- bgcolor=#acb
| Hoyer II || ||?||1318-1320||1320||County of Sternberg||Unmarried
|- bgcolor=#dac
| Gottschalk IV || ||1289||1328-1342||24 February 1342||County of Pyrmont||Adelaide of Homburg(d.11 October 1341)six children
|rowspan="3"| Children of Herman II, ruled jointly.
|- bgcolor=#dac
| Henry I || ||?||1328-c. 1330||c. 1330||County of Pyrmont||Unmarried
|- bgcolor=#dac
| Herman IV || ||1310||1328-1334||1334||County of Pyrmont||Unmarried
|- bgcolor=#dac
| Henry II || ||?||1342-1390||1390||County of Pyrmont||Unknownthree children
|rowspan="4"| Children of Gottschalk IV, ruled jointly.
|- bgcolor=#dac
| Gottschalk V || ||?||1342-1355||1355||County of Pyrmont||Unmarried
|- bgcolor=#dac
| Herman V || ||?||1342-1360||1360||County of Pyrmont||Oda(d.1360)no children/three children
|- bgcolor=#dac
| Herman VI || ||?||1342-1377||1377||County of Pyrmont||Unmarried
|- bgcolor=#acb
| Henry IV || ||?||1346-1385||1385||County of Sternberg||Adelaide of Holstein-Pinneberg(c. 1330-bef. 21 May 1376)1348two children|| 
|- bgcolor=#fff
| Otto II || ||c. 1305||1348-1369||11 November 1369||County of Waldeck||Matilda of Brunswick-Lüneburg(d.1355)27 August 1339two childrenMargaret of Löwenbergno children|| 
|- bgcolor=#caa
| Henry III || ||?||1349-1356||After19 December 1369||County of Schwalenberg||Unmarried|| Sold his estates to Waldeck in 1356, and pursued a religious life.
|- bgcolor=#caa
|colspan="8" align="center"|Schwalenberg reabsorbed in Waldeck
|- bgcolor=#fff
| Henry VI of Iron || ||c. 1340||1369-1397||16 February 1397||County of Waldeck||Elizabeth of Berg(c. 1340-4 October 1388)16 December 1363seven children|| 
|- bgcolor=#acb
| John || ||?||1385-1402||1402||County of Sternberg||Unmarried|| Left no heirs. The county was annexed to Waldeck.
|- bgcolor=#acb
|colspan="8" align="center"|Sternberg annexed to Waldeck
|- bgcolor=#dac
| Henry III || ||?||1390-1429||1429||County of Pyrmont||Pelektwo childrenHaseke of Spiegelberg(d.22 March 1465)two children|| Son of Henry II (or according to other sources, son of Herman V).
|- bgcolor=#fff
| Henry VII || ||c. 1370||1397-c. 1445||After 1442(c. 1445?)||County of Waldeck||Margaret of Nassau-Wiesbaden-Idstein(1380-aft.1435)27 August 1398three children
|rowspan="2"|Children of Henry VI, divided the land. 
|- bgcolor=#bda
| Adolph III || ||1362||1397-1431||After19 April 1431||County of Landau||Agnes of Ziegenhain(d.aft.26 December 1438)1387one child
|- bgcolor=#dac
| Henry IV || ||?||1429-1478||1478||County of Pyrmont||Unmarried
|rowspan="2"| Children of Gottschalk II, ruled jointly.
|- bgcolor=#dac
| Maurice || ||1418||1429-1494||1494||County of Pyrmont||Margaret of Nassau-Beilstein(d.27 December 1498)1462no children
|- bgcolor=#dac
|colspan="8" align="center"|Inherited by the Spiegelberg family (1494-1557), the House of Lippe (1557-1583) and the Gleichen family (1583-1625)Definitely annexed to Waldeck-Wildungen (from 1625)
|- bgcolor=#bda
| Otto III || ||1389||1431-1459||1459||County of Landau||Anna of Oldenburg(d.aft.7 April 1438)1424three children||
|- bgcolor=#fff
| Wolrad I || ||1399||c. 1445-1475||After1 February 1475||County of Waldeck||Barbara of Wertheim(1420-aft.1443)Bef.9 March 1440three children|| 
|- bgcolor=#bda
| Otto IV || ||1440||1459-1495||14 October 1495||County of Landau||Matilda of Neuenahr(d.26 May 1465)16 January 1464one childElisabeth of Tecklenburg(d.aft.1499)1465no children||
|- bgcolor=#bda
|colspan="8" align="center"|Landau annexed by Eisenberg
|- bgcolor=#fff
| Philip I || ||1445||1475||1475||County of Waldeck||Joanne of Nassau-Siegen16 August 1452 or14 October 1464one child
|rowspan="2"| Children of Wolrad I. Philip I died months after his father. Philip II ruled at first as regent of his nephew, and then divided the land with him, in 1486.
|- bgcolor=#cde
| Philip II || ||3 March 1453||1486-1524||16 October 1524||County of Eisenberg||Catherine of Solms-Lich(1458-12 December 1492)3 November 1478six childrenCatherine of Querfurt(1450-22 February 1521)1497no children
|- bgcolor=#fff
|colspan="7" align=center| Regency of Philip II, Count of Waldeck-Eisenberg (1475-1486)
|rowspan="2"|
|- bgcolor=#fff
| Henry VIII || ||1465||1475-1513||28 May 1513||County of Waldeck(1475–86)County of Wildungen(1486-1513)||Anastasia of Runkel(d.24 April 1503)Aft. 8 January 1492three children 
|- bgcolor=#fff
| Philip IV || ||1493||1513-1574||30 November 1574||County of Wildungen||Margaret of East Frisia(1500-15 July 1537)17 February 1523Emdennine childrenCatherine of Hatzfeld(d.1546)1539no childrenJutta of Isenburg-Grenzau(d.28 July 1564)6 October 1554two children|| 
|- bgcolor=#cde
| Philip III the Elder || ||9 December 1486||1524-1539||20 June 1539||County of Eisenberg||Adelaide of Hoya(d.11 April 1513)20 November 1503Bad Wildungenfour childrenAnna of Cleves(21 May 1495 – 24 May 1567)22 January 1519Klevefour children|| 
|- bgcolor=#cde
| Wolrad II the Scholar || ||27 March 1509||1539-1575||15 April 1575||County of Eisenberg||Anastasia Günthera of Schwarzburg-Blankenburg(31 March 1526 – 1 April 1570)6 June 1546Waldeckthirteen children
|rowspan="5"| Children of Philip III, divided the land, by mediation of Philip I, Landgrave of Hesse: the children from Philip III's first marriage, Wolrad and Otto, kept Waldeck, while the sons from the second marriage, John, Philip and Francis, inherited Landau. For the children who are usually said that did not reign (Otto, Philip and Francis), they are sometimes treated as Waldeck-Eisenberg (in the case of Otto) and Waldeck-Landau (cases of Philip V and Francis), which are the parts the called reigning brothers actually ruled, which may imply a level of co-regency between the brothers:
 Otto joined the Order of St. John in 1539, and abdicated in the same year of his father's death, which seems to imply that he reigned in that year.
Philip V, like Otto, may have reigned, even if for only a few months, in Landau, together with his brother John I. Also, at the time of the division, Philip was not exercising any clerical position (was canon at Mainz in 1530, and then reappears as canon in Cologne in 1544), which would possibly extend a co-rulership that ended with Philip resuming his religious life at Cologne.
 The same can be said for Francis, who was taken by Anne of Cleves to England in 1540. Given that he is documented starting his religious career only in 1549, nothing seems to oppose a brief co-rulership of Francis in 1539–40, before his trip to England.
|- bgcolor=#cde
| Otto V || ||1504||1539||8 March 1541||County of Eisenberg||Unmarried
|- bgcolor=#bda
| John I the Pious ||||1521||1539-1567||9 April 1567||County of Landau||Anna of Lippe(1529-24 November 1590)1 October 1550Detmoldeight children
|- bgcolor=#bda
| Philip V the Deaf || ||1519||1539-c. 1544?||5 March 1584||County of Landau||Elisabeth von Elsen(d. 12 June 1584)27 June 1576Hückeswagenno children
|- bgcolor=#bda
| Francis II  || ||1526||1539-c. 1540?||29 July 1574||County of Landau||Maria Gogreve(d.1580)1563no children
|- bgcolor=#bda
| Philip VI the Younger || ||4 October 1551||1567-1579||9 November 1579||County of Landau||Unmarried
|rowspan="2"| Children of John I, ruled jointly. As neither of them left descendants, Landau was reabsorbed in Eisenberg.
|- bgcolor=#bda
| Francis III|| ||27 June 1553||1567-1597||12 March 1597||County of Landau||Unmarried
|- bgcolor=#bda
|colspan="8" align="center"|Landau was reabsorbed into Eisenberg
|- bgcolor=#fff
| Daniel || ||1 August 1530||1574-1577||7 June 1577||County of Wildungen||Barbara of Hesse11 November 1568Kasselno children|| Left no heirs, and was succeeded by his brother Henry.
|- bgcolor=#cde
| Josias I || ||18 March 1554||1575-1588||6 August 1588||County of Eisenberg||Maria of Barby-Mühlingen(8 April 1563 – 29 December 1619)8 March 1582four children
|rowspan="2"| Children of Wolrad II, ruled jointly. 
|- bgcolor=#cde
| Wolrad III || ||16 June 1563||1575-1587||12 November 1587||County of Eisenberg||Unmarried
|- bgcolor=#fff
| Henry IX || ||10 December 1531||1577||3 October 1577||County of Wildungen||Anna of Viermund-Nordenbeck(1538-1599)19 December 1563Korbachno children|| Died shortly after his brother, and didn't have children as well.
|- bgcolor=#fff
| Gunther || ||19 June 1557||1577-1585||23 May 1585||County of Wildungen||Margaret of Waldeck-Landau(1559-20 October 1580)15 December 1578Bad Wildungenno childrenMargaret of Gleichen(28 May 1556 – 14 January 1619)20 May 1582Gräfentonnaone child|| His second marriage brought the county of Bad Pyrmont back to Waldeck control.
|- bgcolor=#fff
|colspan="7" align=center| Regency of Margaret of Gleichen (1585-1598)
|rowspan="2"| His death determined the extinction of the main branch of the House of Waldeck.
|- bgcolor=#fff
| William Ernest || ||8 June 1584||1585-1598||16 September 1598||County of Wildungen||Umarried
|- bgcolor=#fff
|colspan="8" align="center"|Wildungen briefly annexed to Eisenberg
|- bgcolor=#cde
| Wolrad IV || ||7 June 1588||1588-1640||6 October 1640||County of Eisenberg||Anna of Baden-Durlach(13 June 1587 – 11 March 1649)8 September 1607Durlachten children
|rowspan="2"|Children of Josias I, divided the land. Christian took Wildungen for himself after its annexation in 1598.
|- bgcolor=#fff
| Christian || ||25 December 1585||1607-1637||31 December 1637||County of Wildungen||Elisabeth of Nassau-Siegen(8 November 1584 – 26 July 1661)18 November 1604Bad Wildungenfifteen children
|- bgcolor=#fff
| Philip VII || ||25 November 1613||1637-1645||24 February 1645||County of Wildungen||Anna Catherine of Sayn-Wittgenstein(2 July 1610 – 1 December 1650)26 October 1634Frankfurt am Mainsix children||
|- bgcolor=#cde
| Philip Theodore || ||2 November 1614||1640-1645||7 December 1645||County of Eisenberg||Maria Magdalena of Nassau-Siegen(21 October 1622 – 30 August 1647)25 August 1639Culemborgtwo children|| 
|- bgcolor=#cde
|colspan="7" align=center| Regency of George Frederick, Count of Waldeck-Eisenberg (1645-1659)
|rowspan="2"| Left no heirs, and was succeeded by his uncle and previous regent.
|- bgcolor=#cde
| Henry Wolrad || ||28 March 1642||1645-1664||15 July 1664||County of Eisenberg||Juliane Elisabeth of Waldeck-Wildungen(1637-1707)no children
|- bgcolor=#fff
|colspan="7" align=center| Regencies of Anna Catherine of Sayn-Wittgenstein (1645-1660) and Henry Wolrad, Count of Waldeck-Eisenberg (1659-1660)
|rowspan="3"| Children of Philip VII, ruled jointly.
|- bgcolor=#fff
| Christian Louis || ||29 July 1635||1645-1706||12 December 1706||County of Wildungen(1645–92)County of Waldeck and Pyrmont(1692-1706)||Anna Elisabeth of Rappoltstein(7 March 1644 – 6 December 1676)2 July 1658fifteen childrenJohanna of Nassau-Saarbrücken-Idstein(14 September 1657 – 14 March 1733)6 June 1680Idsteinten children
|- bgcolor=#fff
| Josias II || ||2 July 1636||1645-1669||8 August 1669||County of Wildungen||Wilhelmine Christine of Nassau-Siegen(10 July 1629 – 22 January 1700)26 January 1660Arolsenseven children
|- bgcolor=#cde
| George Frederick || ||31 January 1620||1664-1692||19 November 1692||County of Eisenberg(1664–82)Principality of Eisenberg(1682–92)||Elisabeth Charlotte of Nassau-Siegen(11 March 1626 – 16 November 1694)29 November 1643Culemborgnine children|| In 1682, he received the title of Prince. Left no surviving male heirs. The principality was inherited by Wildungen, which was kept as a county until a few years later.
|- bgcolor=#cde
|colspan="8" align="center"|Eisenberg (except Culemborg) was definitely annexed to Wildungen
|- bgcolor=#cde
| Louise Anna || ||18 April 1653||1692-1714||30 June 1714||County of Eisenberg(at Culemborg)||George IV, Count of Erbach-Fürstenau22 August 1671Arolsenfour children|| Kept the lordship of Culemborg. As she survived all her children, the lordship was inherited, after her death, by her nephew, Ernest, Duke of Saxe-Hildburghausen.
|- bgcolor=#cde
|colspan="8" align="center"|Culemborg was inherited by Saxe-Hildburghausen|- bgcolor=#fff
| Frederick Anton Ulrich || ||26 November 1676||1706-1728||1 January 1728||County of Waldeck and Pyrmont(1706–12)Principality of Waldeck and Pyrmont(1712–28)||Louise of Palatinate-Zweibrücken-Birkenfeld(28 October 1678 – 3 May 1753)22 October 1700Hanaueleven children
|rowspan="2"| Children of Christian Louis. Frederick Anton was elevated in 1712 to hereditary prince by Emperor Charles VI. On 30 September 1695, their father had changed the primogeniture house law of the Waldeck house, which he had enacted in 1685 and modified in 1687, insofar as he issued a paragium under the established suzerainty of the ruling line of the house, consisting of the three villages of Bergheim, Königshagen and Welle. This paragium, or vassal line, was inherited by Christian Louis' second son, Josias I.
|- bgcolor=#fca
| Josias I || ||20 August 1696||1706-1763||2 February 1763||County of Bergheim||Dorothea Sophia Wilhelmine zu Solms-Rödelheim and Assenheim(27 January 1698 – 6 February 1774)17 January 1825seven children 
|- bgcolor=#fff
| Charles August || ||24 September 1704||1728-1763||29 August 1763||Waldeck and Pyrmont||Christiane Henriette of Palatinate-Zweibrücken-Birkenfeld19 August 1741Zweibrückenseven children||
|- bgcolor=#fff
| Frederick Charles August || ||25 October 1743||1763-1812||24 September 1812||Waldeck and Pyrmont||Unmarried||Left no heirs and was succeeded by his brother.
|- bgcolor=#fca
| George || ||20 July 1732||1763-1771||9 April 1771||County of Bergheim||Christine of Isenburg-Meerholz(22 November 1742 – 20 March 1808)31 August 1766no children|| Left no heirs and was succeeded by his brother.
|- bgcolor=#fca
| Josias II || ||16 October 1733||1771-1788||4 January 1788||County of Bergheim||Christine Wilhelmine of Isenburg-Büdingen(24 June 1756 – 13 November 1826)5 March 1772no children||
|- bgcolor=#fca
| Josias III || ||13 May 1774||1788-1829||9 June 1829||County of Bergheim||Wilhelmine of Löwenstein-Wertheim-Freudenberg(23 April 1774 – 25 June 1817)10 January 1802no children|| Left no heirs and was succeeded by his brother.
|- bgcolor=#fff
| George I || ||6 May 1747||1812-1813||9 September 1813||Waldeck and Pyrmont||Augusta of Schwarzburg-Sondershausen(1 February 1768 – 26 December 1849)12 September 1784Otterwischthree children||Brother of the previous.
|- bgcolor=#fff
| George II || ||20 September 1789||1813-1845||15 May 1845||Waldeck and Pyrmont||Emma of Anhalt-Bernburg-Schaumburg-Hoym26 June 1823Schaumburgfive children||
|- bgcolor=#fca
| Charles || ||17 November 1778||1829-1849||21 January 1849||County of Bergheim||Karoline Schilling von Canstatt(2 February 1798 – 7 October 1866)25 April 1819six children||
|- bgcolor=#fff
|colspan="7" align=center| Regency of Emma of Anhalt-Bernburg-Schaumburg-Hoym  (1845-1858)
|rowspan="2"|
|- bgcolor=#fff
| George Victor || ||14 January 1831||1845-1893||12 May 1893||Waldeck and Pyrmont||Helena of Nassau26 September 1853Wiesbadenseven childrenLouise of Schleswig-Holstein-Sonderburg-Glücksburg29 April 1891Luisenlundone child
|- bgcolor=#fca
| Adalbert I || ||19 February 1833||1849-1893||24 July 1893||County of Bergheim||Agnes Karolina of Sayn-Wittgenstein-Hohenstein(18 April 1834 – 18 February 1886)3 August 1858seven childrenIda Charlotte of Sayn-Wittgenstein-Hohenstein(25 February 1837 – 7 May 1922)18 October 1887no children||
|- bgcolor=#fff
| Frederick || ||20 January 1865||1893-1918||26 May 1946||Waldeck and Pyrmont||Bathildis of Schaumburg-Lippe9 August 1895Náchodfour children||Brother of Queen Emma of the Netherlands. Abolition of the monarchy in 1918.
|- bgcolor=#fca
| Adalbert II || ||6 January 1863||1893-1918||23 February 1934||County of Bergheim||Unmarried||Abolition of the monarchy in 1918.
|}

Military
Waldeck had raised a battalion of infantry in 1681 but for much of the subsequent history leading up to the Napoleonic Wars, Waldeckers generally served as what is commonly described as 'mercenaries', but was actually 'auxiliaries' hired out by the rulers of Waldeck for foreign service. Such was the demand that the single battalion became two in 1740 (the 1st Regiment), three battalions in 1744, four in 1767 (forming a 2nd Regiment). Most notably the foreign service was with the Dutch (the 1st and 2nd Regiments) and English (after an agreement was signed with the English in 1776 to supply troops for the American War of Independence, the 3rd Waldeck Regiment, of a single battalion, was raised). The 3rd Waldeck Regiment thus served in America, where they were known under the 'umbrella term' used during that conflict for all Germans—'Hessians'. The regiment, which was made up of 4 'Battalion companies', a 'Grenadier' company, staff and a detachment of artillery, was captured by French and Spanish troops supporting the Americans and only a small number returned to Germany, where some formed part of a newly raised 5th Battalion (1784).

By the time of Napoleon's conquest of Germany, the Waldeck Regiments in Dutch service had been dissolved when, as the Batavian Republic, Holland was made into a kingdom ruled by Napoleon's brother Louis. Reduced to battalion strength, they now formed the 3rd battalions of the 1st and 2nd Infantry Regiments of the Kingdom of Holland. The 5th Battalion was disbanded, and Waldeck was now also obliged to provide two companies to the II Battalion, 6th German Confederation (i.e., Confederation of the Rhine) Regiment (along with two companies from Reuß) in the service of the French Empire. As with all French infantry, they were referred to as 'Fusiliers'. They served mainly in the Peninsular War against the Duke of Wellington. In 1812, the 6th Confederation Regiment was re-formed, with three companies from Waldeck and one from Reuß again forming the II Battalion. By the time of the downfall of the French Empire in 1814 the battalions in Dutch service had disappeared, but Waldeck now supplied three Infantry and one Jäger Companies to the newly formed German Confederation.

By 1866, the Waldeck contingent was styled Fürstlisches Waldecksches Füselier-Bataillon, and in the Austro-Prussian War of that year Waldeck (already in a military convention with Prussia from 1862) allied with the Prussians; however the Battalion saw no action. Joining the North German Confederation after 1867, under Prussian leadership, the Waldeck Fusilier Battalion became the III (Fusilier) Battalion of the Prussian Infantry Regiment von Wittich (3rd Electoral Hessian) No. 83, and as such it remained until 1918. The position of regimental 'Chef' (an honorary title) was held by the Prince of Waldeck and Pyrmont.

Unlike Hesse-Darmstadt, Hesse-Kassel (or Hesse-Cassel) retained no distinctions to differentiate them from the Prussian. The Waldeckers however, were permitted the distinction of carrying the Cockade of Waldeck on the Pickelhaube. The Waldeck battalion was garrisoned, at various times, at Arolsen/Mengeringhausen/Helsen, Bad Wildungen, Bad Pyrmont and Warburg.

The regiment saw action in the Franco-Prussian War of 1870 (where it acquired the nickname Das Eiserne Regiment''), and during the First World War—as part of the 22nd Division—fought mainly on the Eastern Front.

See also
 Arolsen Castle

References

External links

Principality of Waldeck 
Canon law of the regnancy Waldeck, 1556
Decorations of the Principality of Waldeck
National anthem and flags

 
States and territories disestablished in 1918
States and territories established in 1180
Former states and territories of Lower Saxony
States of the German Empire
States of the German Confederation
States of the North German Confederation
States of the Confederation of the Rhine
Principalities of the Holy Roman Empire
 
1180s establishments in the Holy Roman Empire
1180 establishments in Europe
1918 disestablishments in Germany